Kožul is a Serbo-Croatian surname. Notable people with the surname include:

Zdenko Kožul (born 1966), Croatian chess grandmaster
Vladimir Kožul (born 1975), Serbian footballer

See also
Kožulj

Croatian surnames
Serbian surnames